Hubertus Johannes Nicolaas "Ben" Wijnstekers (born 31 August 1955) is a Dutch retired footballer who was active as a defender. Wijnstekers made his professional debut at Feyenoord Rotterdam, but also played for K.R.C. Mechelen and Germinal Ekeren.

Honours
 1979–80 : KNVB Cup winner with Feyenoord
 1983–84 : Eredivisie winner with Feyenoord
 1983–84 : KNVB Cup winner with Feyenoord
 First match: 7 June 1976 : Feyenoord Rotterdam – De Graafschap, 8–0

References

 Profile

1955 births
Living people
Dutch footballers
Dutch expatriate footballers
Eredivisie players
Feyenoord players
Beerschot A.C. players
Footballers from Rotterdam
Netherlands international footballers
UEFA Euro 1980 players
Association football defenders
K.R.C. Mechelen players
Belgian Pro League players
Expatriate footballers in Belgium
Dutch expatriate sportspeople in Belgium